Searching for a Former Clarity is the third album by the Gainesville, Florida punk rock band Against Me!, produced by J. Robbins and released on September 6, 2005, by Fat Wreck Chords. Supported by singles and music videos for the songs "Don't Lose Touch" and "From Her Lips to God's Ears (The Energizer)", it was their first album to chart on the Billboard 200, reaching #114. It also reached #9 on Billboard's Top Independent Albums chart. Singer/guitarist Laura Jane Grace has described Searching for a Former Clarity as a concept album.

Composition
Searching for a Former Clarity is a punk rock album  that incorporates elements of folk, dance-punk, post-punk, dub, and country.

Commercial performance 
Searching For a Former Clarity reached #114 on the Billboard 200. As of 2007, the album has sold 52,000 copies.

Critical reception

Reaction to Searching for a Former Clarity was generally positive, with critics praising Grace's lyrics and the band's effective combination of different musical elements. Corey Apar of Allmusic gave the album four and a half stars out of five, calling it the band's "most introspective album to date. In both subject matter and song composition, they expand upon elements of previous releases without being afraid to veer away from expectations". Though describing the tone of the album as "more sober and resentful" in comparison to their previous efforts, he remarked that "the passion, energy, and urgency Against Me! is known for is no less present. Instead, Searching for a Former Clarity is a more developed effort that is not only one of the best punk releases of 2005, but further establishes the band's growing importance within the punk scene."

Aubin Paul of Punknews.org also praised the album, giving it four out of five stars and stating that "Unlike the simple shout-along melodies that adorned previous albums, ...Clarity demands repeated listens far more than any previous album." He praised the band's ability to effectively combine punk rock, country, and folk music, noting that "with Clarity it seems the band has finally managed to fuse these elements seamlessly in a single track." He noted that the lyrics were more personal and "painfully confessional" than on the band's previous efforts, and that the political motifs were more individualistic, focusing on "the effects of politics on real people." He summarized the album as "ambitious, fully realized and truly special. It's also a conflicted record; it's filled with internal ruminations, raw emotions and a distancing wall of sound, but it is nevertheless their most thoughtful and accomplished piece of songwriting and a record that grows more rewarding with each listen."

One criticism which Apar and Paul shared was that both found the chorus of "Unprotected Sex with Multiple Partners" to be "somewhat annoying", though Paul noted that the song had "a great opening and confessional lyrics". Christian Hoard of Rolling Stone was more critical of the album, giving it three out of five stars and describing it as "a bizarro combination of Who's Next, an angry oi-punk record and some dude's blog." He complimented Grace's lyrics as "both wordier and funnier than most rant-based punk" but also said that "over fourteen cuts, [her] Roger Daltrey bellow can grow wearisome". He did, however, praise "Holy Shit!" as "a detailed critique of a stagnating rock scene" and said that "How Low", a slower song in which Grace describes attempts to give up drugs, "prov[es] that you can't get this deep into other people's shit without getting a little on yourself."

Track listing

Total Clarity

Against Me! released Total Clarity, a collection of demos and unreleased songs from the Searching for a Former Clarity recording sessions, through Fat Wreck Chords on May 24, 2011. Fat Wreck Chords previously released The Original Cowboy, an album of demos from the band's 2003 album Against Me! as the Eternal Cowboy, in 2009.

Track listing

Charts

Personnel
Adapted from the album liner notes.

Band
 Laura Jane Grace – guitar, lead vocals
 James Bowman – guitar, backing vocals
 Andrew Seward – bass guitar, backing vocals
 Warren Oakes – drums

Additional musicians
 Chris Pumphrey – alto saxophone on "Miami"
 Rose Hammer – baritone saxophone on "Miami"
 Geof Manthonre – trumpet on "Miami"
 J. Robbins – tambourine on "Unprotected Sex with Multiple Partners" and "Don't Lose Touch"
 Dave Chamberland, Jon Herroon, Mathieu Guilbault, and Olivier Maguire – backing vocals on "Unprotected Sex with Multiple Partners"
 Genevieve Tremblay – backing vocals on "Unprotected Sex with Multiple Partners" and "How Low"

Production
 J. Robbins – producer, engineer, mixing engineer
 Alan Douches – mastering
 Json Munn – design
 Paul Schiek – photography

Chart performance

References

Against Me! albums
2005 albums
Fat Wreck Chords albums